Steve Niehaus (born September 25, 1954) is a former American defensive tackle who played for 4 seasons in the National Football League (NFL). He was the first draft pick for the Seattle Seahawks and the second player taken in the 1976 NFL Draft. Niehaus was the 1976 NFC Defensive Rookie of the Year and holds the Seahawk rookie record for sacks in a season with 9½.

He suffered multiple knee injuries which ended his career.

Notes

1954 births
Living people
All-American college football players
American football defensive tackles
Minnesota Vikings players
Notre Dame Fighting Irish football players
Seattle Seahawks players